This tournament took place between April 9 and 15, 2001.

Carlos Moyá was the defending champion but did not compete that year.

Juan Carlos Ferrero won in the final 7–6(7–3), 4–6, 6–3 against Félix Mantilla.

Seeds

Draw

Finals

Top half

Bottom half

External links
 2001 Estoril Open draw

2001 Men's Singles
Singles
Estoril Open